Syco Music is a defunct division of Syco Entertainment founded by British entrepreneur and record executive Simon Cowell. Originally founded as S Records, the label launched while Cowell was still employed by BMG, the label oversaw music releases by Robson & Jerome, Five, Westlife and Teletubbies. A year later, BMG, now named Sony BMG, bought Cowell's share in both Syco Music and Syco Television. Later in 2010, Cowell and Sony Music entered a joint venture agreement that would see Cowell and Sony each own 50% of the new Syco Entertainment company which encompassed both the previous Syco TV and Syco Music divisions. 
The brand had multiple well-known acts signed such as Fifth Harmony, Camila Cabello, One Direction, Little Mix and CNCO. In July 2020, Sony sold the rights to the television formats and assets back to Cowell, effectively divesting all of Syco's non-music divisions. As part of the venture, Syco Music, its current roster and back catalog remains with Sony Music as a wholly owned subsidiary. However, as of September 2020, and according to industry magazine Music Week, the label is now defunct, with staff either leaving or being redeployed elsewhere within the Sony Music group.

History 
Syco Music had offices in London and Los Angeles and was home to several artists. As S Records, the company oversaw music releases by Robson & Jerome, Five, Westlife and Teletubbies.

Later following television franchises, Syco had the exclusive right to sign winners and finalists of The X Factor and Got Talent. Susan Boyle's debut album, I Dreamed a Dream, has sold over 9 million copies, making it one of the best selling releases of the last decade and Syco's most successful release to date. Between 2004 and 2009, Il Divo achieved four multi-million selling albums and in 2007, Leona Lewis became one of the most successful talent show winners when her second single, "Bleeding Love", propelled the album Spirit to 9 million global sales.

In 2010, Syco began diversifying by adding producer/singer-songwriter Labrinth. Savan Kotecha, who had been writing for Syco acts for several years, also became an A&R Director and set up a joint venture, Kanani Songs. Syco also began forming closer partnerships with other Sony Music Entertainment UK labels. For the first time, Syco entered into an agreement with Columbia Records that would see them work together to launch the career of a The X Factor winner - Matt Cardle. That same year, Sony Music bought Cowell's share of Syco, for around £27 million.

On 15 July 2020, it was announced that Cowell would buy Sony's stake in Syco Entertainment; Sony Music will retain Syco Music's artists and back catalogue. By September 2020, manage director Tyler Brown and Head of Digital Tom Hoare had left. Music Week reported that label is no longer operational and is now defunct; artist staff have been redeployed elsewhere within Sony Music, including at sister label RCA Records, or have left completely.

Logos

Artists
Some of the artists signed by Cowell, such as band Westlife, released their music through S Records, another company formed by Cowell whose share he then sold to BMG in 2003.  Syco Music started releasing music as a label in 2004.

Artists at time of closure 

 Camila Cabello (joint deal with Epic Records)
 Bars and Melody (Leondre Devries and Charlie Lenehan)
 James Arthur (joint deal with Columbia Records)
 Susan Boyle (full UK deal and joint US deal with Columbia Records)
 Collabro
 CNCO
 Il Divo
 Labrinth
 Digital Farm Animals
 Ina Wroldsen  
 PRETTYMUCH 
 Grace VanderWaal
 Il Volo
 Grace Davies
 LSD
 Acacia & Aaliyah
 Courtney Hadwin (joint deal with Arista Records)
 Megan McKenna
 Real Like You

Former artists 

 Steve Brookstein (2004–2005)
 Bianca Ryan (2006–2008)
 George Sampson (2008)
 Angelis (2006–2007)
 Leon Jackson (2007–2009)
 Same Difference (2007–2009)
 Rhydian Roberts (2007–2010)
 Paul Potts (2007–2010)
 Escala (2008–2010)
 Shayne Ward (2005–2011)
 Joe McElderry (2009–2011)
 Westlife (2007–2011)
 Matt Cardle (2010–2012)
 Jackie Evancho (2010–2013)
 Ronan Parke (2011–2012)
 Alexandra Burke (2008–2012)
 Cher Lloyd (2010–2014)
 Loveable Rogues (2012–2013)
 Leona Lewis (2006–2014)
 Jonathan and Charlotte (2012–2014)
 Bars and Melody (2014-present)
 Sam Bailey (2013–2015)
 Melanie Amaro (2011–2013)
 Forte (2013–2014)
Rachel Crow (2011–2015)
Emblem3 (2012–2015)
Chris Rene (2011–2014)
Bea Miller (2013–2017)
Ben Haenow (2014–2016)
 One Direction (2010–2016)
 Reggie 'n' Bollie (2016–2017)
 Fleur East (2014–2017)
 Ella Henderson (2013–2018)
Alex & Sierra (2013–2015)
 Rebecca Ferguson (2010–2016)
 Matt Terry (2016–2018)
Louisa Johnson (2015–2018)
Little Mix (2011–2018)
Rak-Su (2017–2018)
Fifth Harmony (2013–2018)
 Louis Tomlinson (2017–2020)
Dalton Harris (2018–2020)
Tokio Myers (2017–2020)

Theft and copyright
Syco Music and its artists have been the targets of illegal hacking on several separate occasions. In 2009 ahead of the release of Leona Lewis's second album Echo, a number of unfinished demos and leftover songs from the project leaked online. An investigation was launched by the International Federation of the Phonographic Industry (IFPI), working with the record label and police to identify those responsible. Alexandra Burke was also targeted, having two demo versions of songs from her debut album Overcome leak before the album's release. At the end of March 2010 it was reported that Syco had suffered once again from computer hackers who managed to obtain 14 of Burke's previously unheard studio recordings as well as 26 from Lewis.

Following the second incident of leaks, Cowell contacted the FBI to track down those responsible. Included in the leaks was a newly recorded version of Burke's "All Night Long" featuring American rapper Pitbull, which was tipped to be the singer's third single in March 2010. According to Burke, the songs were leaked by "Two little boys in Germany on work experience", working for Syco. It was later revealed in 2011 that songs recorded for Echo were targeted by the German hacker, Deniz A., also known as DJ Stolen. In July 2010, the Rasch law firm logged a criminal complaint against DJ Stolen for "constantly placing hacked songs on the internet". Amongst those songs listed in the complaint was one called "Pulse", described at the time as a new recording by Lewis. DJ Stolen was jailed for 18 months in June 2011.

In 2011, Syco found itself being taken to court for plagiarism after it was reported that a new Lewis song "Collide" significantly copied "Fade Into Darkness", a 2010 song by Swedish house music DJ Avicii. The DJ took both artist and label to the British High Court just prior to its release. However, the case was resolved out of court by releasing the song as a joint single between both artists on 4 September 2011. In February 2013, it was announced that One Direction would be releasing a cover version of "One Way or Another" and "Teenage Kicks" as the 2013 Comic Relief single. However, an unfinished version of the song leaked online and on 7 February 2013 Syco launched an investigation. A spokesperson told the press "It is very disappointing that the song has been leaked and we are currently investigating the matter".

Controversies and criticism 
Syco was the label that all X Factor winners were signed to as part of their contract for winning the show, along with other acts hand-picked by Cowell.
Most of the artists who were once signed to the record label had complained about their deals with the music mogul, which often saw them making little to no money from their contracts; they were also overworked, while many had also complained about creative differences concerning the music they wanted to release. 

In 2021, musical twins Jedward outed the record label Syco for being 'toxic' and 'abusive'. It came after news broke that The X Factor would not be returning to television, prompting the duo to reflect on their time on the show, which they appeared on back in 2009. The duo took to social media and said "Every contestant on the X Factor was a slave to the show and got paid zero while they made millions! The fact every contestant has to act like their judge mentors them! When in reality all they care about is their paycheck!." Jedward also alleged that artists on the show and under Cowell's record label, Syco Music, were unable to speak freely and were blacklisted if they did. They were isolated from their families and were watched and reported on by security. They claimed that the judges on The X Factor did not actually mentor the contestants as the show made it appear.

Their comments came after former X Factor contestants spoke out about the conditions they were expected to work under while signed to the label, including Rebecca Ferguson and Cher Lloyd. Lloyd took to TikTok to take a sly dig at the label, which she appeared to accuse of ‘exploiting’ her and taking all the money made by her music. Meanwhile, Ferguson met with Digital, Culture, Media, and Sport Secretary Oliver Dowden earlier that year, calling for better protection for artists in the music industry.

Number-one singles

References 

2002 establishments in the United Kingdom
British record labels
Companies based in the Royal Borough of Kensington and Chelsea
Companies based in Los Angeles
Music production companies
Music publishing companies of the United Kingdom
Pop record labels
Publishing companies established in 2002
Record labels established in 2002
Sony Music
2020 disestablishments in the United Kingdom
Publishing companies disestablished in 2020